Census Division No. 8 (Central Manitoba) is a census division located within the Central Plains Region of the Province of Manitoba, Canada. Unlike in some other provinces, census divisions do not reflect the organization of local government in Manitoba. These areas exist solely for the purposes of statistical analysis and presentation; they have no government of their own. 

The economics of the area is based on agriculture, livestock and commercial fish on Lake Manitoba. The population of the area as of 2016 was 13,968. Also included in the division is the Sandy Bay First Nation and the southernmost part of the Long Plain First Nation.

Demographics 

Unincorporated communities 

 Gladstone
 MacGregor
 Notre Dame de Lourdes
 Treherne

Rural municipalities

Glenella – Lansdowne
Lorne (part in Division No. 4)
Norfolk Treherne
North Norfolk
Victoria
WestLake-Gladstone

Indian reserves
 Long Plain 6
 Sandy Bay 5

References

External links
 Manitoba Community Profile : Central Manitoba

08